The 2002 Kentucky Wildcats football team represented the University of Kentucky in the 2002 NCAA Division I-A football season. The Wildcats scored 385 points while allowing 301 points.

Though finishing with a 7–5 record, the Wildcats were not bowl eligible due to NCAA sanctions resulting from the tenure of former head coach Hal Mumme.

Season
Kentucky opened with a 22–17 win at #17 Louisville, a nationally broadcast upset at Papa John's Cardinal Stadium in which Kentucky reclaimed the Governor's Cup.  A 77–17 win over UTEP followed (the second largest point total in school history at the time), and wins against Indiana and Middle Tennessee State put Kentucky at 4–0.  A 41–34 loss at #7 Florida was followed by a 16–12 loss to South Carolina that came down to the final play.  A 29–17 win at Arkansas followed.  A 52–24 loss to #5 Georgia was followed by a 45–24 win at Mississippi State.  A 33–30 loss to #16 LSU on the game's final play was followed by a 41–21 win against Vanderbilt and a 24–0 loss at Tennessee.

Schedule

Roster

Team players in the 2003 NFL Draft

References

Kentucky
Kentucky Wildcats football seasons
Kentucky Wildcats football